A convention bounce or convention bump refers to an increase in support that U.S. presidential candidates in the Republican or Democratic party typically enjoy after the televised national convention of their party.  A presumptive nominee for president may also be said to experience a "VP bounce" after announcing his or her pick for vice president prior to the convention. The size and impact of convention bumps vary, but presidential candidates usually see at least a small uptick in their polling numbers coming out of their conventions.

History of convention bounces

1992
Bill Clinton benefited from one of the largest bumps in history after the Democratic National Convention in 1992, climbing by as many as 30 points in the polls, however this was assisted by Independent Ross Perot, who at the time was polling at 20%, withdrawing from the race during the Democratic convention. Incumbent President George H. W. Bush's convention bounce was weak by comparison. Some party leaders blaming former primary challenger Pat Buchanan's fiery and divisive speech, which aired in primetime due to a scheduling delay.

2000
Al Gore's 2000 bounce endured for weeks. Prior to the Democratic convention, Gore was behind Texas Gov. George W. Bush by as many as 16 points, but was in a statistical tie with the Republican the weekend after his acceptance speech.

2004
Contrary to the beliefs of political pundits, Democratic candidate John Kerry did not get a convention bounce in 2004.

2008
Polls indicated a small bounce for 2008 Democratic presidential nominee Barack Obama after his party's convention in August, but as expected, much of it evaporated during and after the Republican convention the week following, yielding GOP candidate John McCain a small lead in several polls. Nielsen ratings revealed that year's party conventions to be the most-watched ever, with the Republican convention narrowly trumping the Democrats'.

2012
The RealClearPolitics polling index revealed the 2012 convention bounces for President Obama and GOP challenger Mitt Romney to be comparably smaller than in past elections. Though Romney pulled even with Obama during that year's Republican convention at the end of August, Obama opened up a three- or four-point lead during the Democratic convention the week after.

2016
In 2016, news sources and polls differed greatly on the size of the convention bounces received by Republican Donald Trump and Democrat Hillary Clinton after their respective conventions; however, the RealClearPolitics polling index showed both candidates trending upward leading up to and after their acceptance speeches. Clinton's bounce lasted somewhat longer than Trump's.

2020
Democratic candidate Joe Biden, who held the lead over incumbent Republican Trump entering the Democratic convention, did not get a convention bounce, with a CNBC-Change Research poll also indicating that the race had instead tightened in the swing states.  Republican candidate Donald Trump similarly did not receive a convention bounce after the Republican convention with a CNN poll indicating that the race remained unchanged after both conventions.

References

Presidential elections in the United States
United States presidential nominating conventions
Political terminology of the United States